Changsŏn'gang station is a railway station in Ŭnsan county, South P'yŏngan province, North Korea. It is the terminus of the Changsŏn'gang Line of the Korean State Railway.

References

Railway stations in North Korea